Princess Theatre, also known as the Princess Theatre Building, is a historic theatre building located at Bloomington, Monroe County, Indiana.  It was built in 1892, and converted and enlarged for use as a theater in 1913. It was subsequently refurbished to its present appearance in 1923. It is a two-story, rectangular, brick building with a glazed terra cotta front.  The front facade features full-height pilasters and an arched opening with decorative brackets. The theater portion of the building was removed in 1985.

It was listed on the National Register of Historic Places in 1983. It is located in the Courthouse Square Historic District.

References

Theatres on the National Register of Historic Places in Indiana
Theatres completed in 1923
Buildings and structures in Bloomington, Indiana
National Register of Historic Places in Monroe County, Indiana
Historic district contributing properties in Indiana
1923 establishments in Indiana